In Henriques v Giles, an important case in the South African law of succession, a husband and wife had instructed their accountant to prepare each of their respective wills. The content of each of the wills varied considerably. The husband accidentally signed his wife's will; his wife accidentally signed his will.

The husband died in 2004, and his wife the following year.

In response to a request to rectify both wills, the court held that the husband's will was capable of being rectified, but the wife's will was not, as the court was not satisfied that she had the requisite capacity to execute a will due to her affliction with Alzheimer's syndrome.

See also 
 South African law of succession

References 
 Henriques v Giles NO and Another; Henriques v Giles NO and Others 2010 (6) SA 51 (SCA).

Notes 

Law of succession in South Africa
Supreme Court of Appeal of South Africa cases
2010 in South African law
2010 in case law